Valdeprado del Río is a municipality located in the autonomous community of Cantabria, Spain.

Localities
Its 291 inhabitants (INE, 2006) live in:

 Aldea de Ebro, 9 hab.
 Arcera, 48 hab.
 Arroyal (Capital), 62 hab.
 Barruelo, 35 hab.
 Bustidoño, 11 hab.
 Candenosa, 1 hab.
 Hormiguera, 33 hab.
 Laguillos, 7 hab.
 Malataja, 17 hab.
 Mediadoro, 13 hab.
 Reocín de los Molinos, 26 hab.
 San Andrés, 29 hab.
 San Vitores, 8 hab.
 Sotillo, 22 hab.
 Valdeprado del Río, 36 hab.

References

Municipalities in Cantabria